Slavic languages of Macedonia may refer to:

 Slavic languages of Macedonia (region), various Slavic languages (historical and modern) spoken in the geographical region of Macedonia (Old Slavic, Church Slavic, Macedonian, Bulgarian, Serbian)
 Slavic languages in Ottoman Macedonia, various Slavic languages and dialects spoken in the region of Macedonia during the Ottoman rule
 Slavic languages of Macedonia (Greece), various Slavic languages and dialects spoken in the Greek region of Macedonia
 Slavic languages of North Macedonia, various Slavic languages spoken in the Republic of North Macedonia (Macedonian, Bulgarian, Serbian)

See also
 Languages of Macedonia (disambiguation)
 Macedonian language (disambiguation)
 Macedonia (disambiguation)
 Macedonian (disambiguation)